Tom Fullarton (born 23 February 1999) is an Australian rules footballer and former basketball player who currently plays for the Brisbane Lions in the Australian Football League (AFL).

Basketball career

2016 FIBA U-17 World Cup (Australia) 
Fullarton was named captain of the Australian 2016 under 17 world cup squad. The team couldn't make it past the quarter-finals going down 74-63 to host nation Spain. The Australian national team coach, Andrej Lemanis stated he was "Boomers material".

Brisbane Bullets (2016-2018)
Fullarton was signed as a development player for the Brisbane Bullets, who were coached by Lemanis, in 2016 for their 2016-17 season when the Bullets rejoined the league after previously losing their licence in 2008. On 21 January 2017, the team released Jermaine Beal from the roster and signed Fullarton to a full contract for the 2017-2018 season. In May 2018, Fullarton announced he would leave the Bullets and basketball to play for Australian rules football for the Brisbane Lions in the AFL.

AFL career

Brisbane Lions (2018-present)
Fullarton spent the 2018 and 2019 seasons playing in the North East Australian Football League. He made his debut appearance in Round 13 of the 2020 AFL Season against St. Kilda coming off the bench, kicking one goal and two behinds. He kicked his first career AFL goal in the third quarter. The Lions won by two over St. Kilda 50 (6.14) to 48 (7.6).

Statistics
Updated to the end of the 2022 season.

|-
| 2020 ||  || 47
| 2 || 1 || 3 || 5 || 4 || 9 || 1 || 2 || 0.5 || 1.5 || 2.5 || 2.0 || 4.5 || 0.5 || 1.0
|-
| 2021 ||  || 21
| 12 || 3 || 1 || 52 || 73 || 125 || 22 || 21 || 0.3 || 0.1 || 4.3 || 6.1 || 10.4 || 1.8 || 1.8
|-
| 2022 ||  || 21
| 5 || 2 || 0 || 23 || 15 || 38 || 12 || 4 || 0.4 || 0.0 || 4.6 || 3.0 || 7.6 || 2.4 || 0.8
|- class=sortbottom
! colspan=3 | Career
! 19 !! 6 !! 4 !! 80 !! 92 !! 172 !! 35 !! 27 !! 0.3 !! 0.2 !! 4.2 !! 4.8 !! 9.1 !! 1.8 !! 1.4
|}

Notes

References

External links

NBL profile

Australian men's basketball players
1999 births
Living people
Sportspeople from the Sunshine Coast
Brisbane Bullets players
Australian rules footballers from Queensland
Brisbane Lions players